Qaleh Sar may refer to:
 Qaleh Sar, Neka, Mazandaran Province
 Qaleh Sar, Sari, Mazandaran Province
 Qaleh Sar, Tonekabon, Mazandaran Province